Herpestes is a genus within the mongoose family Herpestidae. Several species in the family are known as slender mongooses. It is the type genus of the family, and comprises 5-6 living species, each with several subspecies.
Fossil remains of three prehistoric species were excavated in France, and described in 1853.

Characteristics
The living Herpestes species are sexually dimorphic, with females smaller than males. They share several characteristics, including the shape of the cheek teeth and of the tympanic bullae, and the presence of the first upper molar teeth. They are all solitary.
Males have one chromosome less than females, as one Y chromosome is translocated to an autosome.

Classification
The scientific name Herpestes was proposed by Johann Karl Wilhelm Illiger in 1811 for mongoose species in the south of the Old World, commonly called "Ichneumon" at the time.
Until 1835, 12 mongoose species from Africa and Asia were classified as belonging to the genus Herpestes.
In 1864, John Edward Gray listed 22 Herpestes species, which he considered as part of the Viverridae.
In 1882, Oldfield Thomas reviewed African mongoose zoological specimens in natural history museums. He subordinated those into the genus Herpestes that have nearly naked soles, four premolars, small last lower molars with two external cusps and whose last upper molars are 40-60% smaller than the last upper premolars. His list comprised eight species in Africa.
St. George Jackson Mivart listed 21 Herpestes species, including seven in Africa and 13 in Asia. He also determined Herpestes species by the dentition of mongoose specimens. His criteria included small premolars, small inner cusps of the third upper premolars and transversely extended second upper molars with rather concave posterior margins; their bodies are long with long tails, short legs and five digits to each paw.
Wallace Christopher Wozencraft recognised 10 Herpestes species as valid in 2005.

The extinct Herpestes lemanensis was excavated in tertiary depositions in the Loire Valley in central France and described in 1853. It most likely dates to the Late Oligocene.

The following African mongooses are now placed in the genus Herpestes:

References

 
Taxa named by Johann Karl Wilhelm Illiger
Taxonomy articles created by Polbot
Mammal genera